T. nigricauda may refer to:
 Tatera nigricauda, the black-tailed gerbil, a rodent species
 Thallomys nigricauda, the black-tailed tree rat, a rodent species southwestern Africa
 Thrypticus nigricauda, Wood, 1913, a fly species in the genus Thrypticus

See also
 Nigricauda (disambiguation)